Łukasz Starowicz (born 7 May 1976) is a Polish snowboarder. He competed in two events at the 1998 Winter Olympics.

References

1976 births
Living people
Polish male snowboarders
Olympic snowboarders of Poland
Snowboarders at the 1998 Winter Olympics
Sportspeople from Bielsko-Biała